Plagiobothrys plurisepaleus  (common name - White rochelia) is a species of flowering plant in the borage family. It is native to Australia, being found in all mainland states: New South Wales, Queensland, Victoria, South Australia, Western Australia and the Northern Territory, in moist areas in and around claypans.<ref name=florabase>{{FloraBase|id=10974|name=Plagiobothrys plurisepalus}}</ref>

Description
The inflorescence is coiled in bud,  but generally elongates in fruit. The pedicels  are generally 0–1 mm, and the flower is bisexual with the sepals fused below the middle.

Taxonomy
It was first described as Maccoya sepalea in 1859 by Ferdinand von Mueller, but was assigned to the genus, Plagiobothrys'', in 1928 by Ivan Murray Johnston.

References

External links
 Plagiobothrys plurisepaleus occurrence data from the Australasian Virtual Herbarium

plurisepaleus
Flora of New South Wales
Flora of South Australia
Plants described in 1859
Taxa named by Ferdinand von Mueller